Microbryum davallianum is a species of moss belonging to the family Pottiaceae.

It is native to Europe and Northern America.

Synonym:
 Pottia davalliana (Sm.) C.E.O.Jensen

References

Pottiaceae